Fazila Kaiser (nee Kazi ), is a Pakistani television actress, producer, writer and chef. She has been a major television personality for over four decades. Once noted as the epitome of Pakistan's traditional "girl next door", Kazi established her reputation in 1988 as a fashion model and entered into the drama industry in 1991.

Early life and education
Kaiser studied at the government School and attended the Urdu Science College and later forwarded for a BA degree from the Karachi University.

Personal life 
 and her husband, Kaiser Khan Nizamani, is himself a famous actor, director and producer. She and Kaiser married in 1993 and they have two sons.

Select filmography

2022 hasrat hum tv

See also
 Fazila

References 

Living people
Pakistani television people
Pakistani female models
Pakistani television actresses
Pakistani child actresses
Actresses from Karachi
20th-century Pakistani actresses
21st-century Pakistani actresses
University of Karachi alumni
People from Hyderabad District, Pakistan
Pakistan Television Corporation people
1970 births